is a Japanese rock band, formed in 2006. They made their major label debut on May 26, 2010, and were signed by Ariola Japan.

Career 
Okamoto's was formed by four junior high school students. Fans of influential Japanese avant-garde artist Tarō Okamoto, the members took a cue from The Ramones and each adopted stage names with the surname Okamoto.

Okamoto's made their recording debut with an appearance on the Columbia compilation "Here Come the Modernity" in February 2009, then followed it up in June with their debut album, Here Are Okamoto's. Soon after, Masaru Okamoto left the band and was replaced by Hama Okamoto. In support of the album, they gave a sold-out solo performance to commemorate its release. Playing over ten shows a month, they managed to perform over one hundred times in 2009.

In March 2010, they performed at the South by Southwest music festival in Austin, Texas, and also performed in 6 other cities around the United States as part of the Japan Nite tour.

On May 26, 2010, they made their major label debut under the Ariola Japan record label, an affiliate of Sony Music Entertainment Japan. It was announced that Okamoto's major debut single,  was chosen as the 18th ending theme of the anime series Naruto: Shippuden.

On February 4, 2015, Okamoto's 6th single "Headhunt" was chosen as the opening theme for the anime series Durarara!!x2 Shou.

In 2016, Okamoto's released their 9th single "Brother" as the ending theme for the Netflix series Hibana: Spark. In 2020, the Okamoto's song "Welcome My Friend" was used as the ending theme for the anime series Fugou Keiji: Balance Unlimited.

Members 
 – vocals
 Real name . Born October 19, 1990 in New York City. Eldest son of American jazz saxophonist Scott Hamilton.
 – guitar
 Real name . Born November 5, 1990 in Nerima City, Tokyo, Japan.
 – drums
 Real name . Born January 9, 1991 in Futako-Tamagawa, Setagaya, Tokyo. Former Zutto Zuletellz member. He is the eldest son of The Privates lead singer . In his childhood he was a child actor in TV dramas.
 – bass (2009–present)
 Real name . Born March 12, 1991 in Tokyo. Former Zutto Zuletellz member. He is the eldest son of Masatoshi Hamada and Natsumi Ogawa.

Former members
 – bass (2006–2009)

Discography

Studio albums 
 Here Are Okamoto's (June 3, 2009)
 10's (May 26, 2010) Oricon Albums Chart Peak Position: No. 63
  No. 55
  No. 44
 Okamoto's (January 23, 2013) No. 30
 Let It V (January 15, 2014) No. 14
 VXV (August 27, 2014) No. 27
 Opera (September 30, 2015) No. 27
 No More Music (August 02, 2017) No. 21
 Boy (January 9, 2019) No. 13
 Kno Where (September 29, 2021)

Extended plays 
 Count 1000 EP (December 22, 2009)
 BL-EP (December 21, 2016) No. 139
 Welcome My Friend (August 26, 2020)

Live albums 
 Live Rare Trax (July 24, 2017)
 Live (May 31, 2017) No. 46

Singles 
  Oricon Singles Chart Peak Position: No. 79
  No. 64
  No. 54
 "Joy Joy Joy"/ No. 79
 "Sexy Body" (November 6, 2013) No. 78
 "Headhunt" (February 4, 2015) No. 26
 "Dance With Me"/"Dance With You" (June 17, 2015) No. 36
 "Beautiful Days" (November 25, 2015) No. 55
 "Brother" (June 1, 2016) No. 44

Limited singles 
 "Zeroman (Movie Ver.)" (March 1, 2015)
 "Burning Love" (September 9, 2016)
 "Rocky" (October 14, 2016)
 "90's Tokyo Boys" (July 14, 2017)
 "Dreaming Man" (December 14, 2019)
 "Higher" (December 14, 2019)

Home videos 
 Okamoto's 5th Anniversary Happy! Birthday! Party! Tour! Final @ Hibiya Open-air Music Hall (March 18, 2015) Oricon DVDs Chart Peak Position: No. 58

References

External links 
 Official website 

Japanese alternative rock groups
Japanese garage rock groups
Sony Music Entertainment Japan artists
Musical groups established in 2006
Musical groups from Tokyo